Shusef District is a district (bakhsh) in Nehbandan County, South Khorasan Province, Iran. At the 2006 census, its population was 14,183, in 3,769 families.  The District has one city: Shusef.  The District has two rural districts (dehestan): Arabkhaneh Rural District and Shusef Rural District.

References 

Districts of South Khorasan Province
Nehbandan County